The 1964 Five Nations Championship was the thirty-fifth series of the rugby union Five Nations Championship. Including the previous incarnations as the Home Nations and Five Nations, this was the seventieth series of the northern hemisphere rugby union championship. 10 matches were played between 4 January and 11 April. It was contested by England, France, Ireland, Scotland and Wales.

Participants
The teams involved were:

Table

Results

External links

The official RBS Six Nations Site

Six Nations Championship seasons
Five Nations
Five Nations
Five Nations
Five Nations
Five Nations
Five Nations
Five Nations
Five Nations
Five Nations
Five Nations